6 Day Bike Rider is a 1934 American comedy film directed by Lloyd Bacon, written by Earl Baldwin, and starring Joe E. Brown, Maxine Doyle, Frank McHugh, Gordon Westcott, Arthur Aylesworth and Lottie Williams. The film's production lasted for 11 days, starting on July 9, 1934. A multi-bicyclist collision happened during close-up filming. Reggie McNamara, who was known as the "Iron Man" due to his 108 six-day bicycle races, had his film debut as one of the racers. It was released by Warner Bros. on October 20, 1934.

Plot
This is the story of a young clerk who has failed at everything he has tried in his life so far.  He enters a six-day bicycle race to impress his girlfriend and hilarious hijinks ensue. He eventually wins this race, marries his girlfriend and they live happily ever after.

Production
Production began on July 9, 1934 by First National Pictures and it lasted for 11 days. During production, children could meet the star Joe E. Brown and talk to him. Warner Brothers distributed the film. Bacon based the film on six-day racing, in which a team of two people would circle a wooden track on a bicycle for six days. The team typically consisted of a man and a woman and they would take turns riding on the bicycle. Reggie McNamara, known as the “Iron Man” because of his 108 six-day bicycle races, played the part of one of the racers in his film debut.

A collision started when a bicycle's wheel collapsed, causing 16 bicyclists to hit a cameraman's motorcycle who was attempting to film close to the action. Nine of the bicyclists were hurt, including one who was critically injured.

Release
6 Day Bike Rider was released theatrically in 1934 with the featurettes Darling Enemy, starring Gertrude Niesen, the Merrie Melodies cartoon Rhythm in the Bow and recent news. On November 24, 1934 in Plainfield, New Jersey, the film was screened during events that were based around the film. The two day long events included a "Recreation Field Day of Joe. E. Brown's 6 Day Bike Rider", a costume bicycle parade, a trick rider, a children's show, and a screening of 6 Day Bike Rider at the Oxford Theater.

Reception
A review in The Owensboro Messenger said, "6 Day Bike Rider is a hilarious comedy of thrills and spills on racing track." An Arizona Daily Star article stated that 6 Day Bike Rider is "said to be one of the most humorous pictures of Joe. E Brown's long comedy career." AllMovie reviewer Hal Erickson wrote, "Even though the fad which inspired it has passed into history, Six-Day Bike Rider remains fresh and funny today."

A Variety reviewer was unimpressed with the performances, stating that the film has a "foolish story" and concluded their review by saying, "With Director Lloyd Bacon, it was a case of being handed a bowl of tapioca and told to make caviar." A TV Guide review states, "Unusually poor outing for Brown finds him entering a six-day bicycle race, which he wins, naturally".

Cast       
Joe E. Brown as Wilfred Simpson
Maxine Doyle as Phyllis Jenkins
Frank McHugh as Clinton Hemmings
Gordon Westcott as Harry St. Clair
Arthur Aylesworth as Col. Jenkins
Lottie Williams as Mrs. Jenkins
Dorothy Christy as Mrs. Mabel St. Clair

References

External links
 

1934 comedy films
1934 films
American black-and-white films
American comedy films
Films directed by Lloyd Bacon
First National Pictures films
Warner Bros. films
1930s English-language films
1930s American films